Frank B. Livingstone (December 8, 1928March 21, 2005) was an American biological anthropologist.

Early life and education
Livingstone was born in Winchester, Massachusetts to Guy P. Livingstone and Margery Brown Livingstone. He graduated from Winchester High School in 1946 and earned his bachelor's degree in Mathematics at Harvard University in 1950. He completed a doctoral degree in 1957 and joined the University of Michigan’s anthropology faculty in 1959 where he became Professor Emeritus of Biological Anthropology.

Career
Livingstone's primary area of research was genetic variation in modern human populations. For his groundbreaking work on sickle cell anemia, Livingstone was awarded the Martin Luther King Award from the Southern Christian Leadership Conference. After his retirement in 1998, Livingstone was awarded the Charles R. Darwin Award for Lifetime Achievement from the American Association of Physical Anthropologists (AAPA). In 2002, a symposium was held in his honor at the annual meeting of the AAPA in Buffalo, New York.

Death
Livingstone died on March 21, 2005 in Springfield, Ohio, due to complications from Parkinson's disease.

Bibliography
Abnormal Hemoglobin in Human Populations (Aldine Press, 1967)
Data on the Abnormal Hemoglobin's and Glucose-Six-Phosphate Deficiency in Human Populations (1973)
Frequencies of Hemoglobin Variants: Thalassemia, The Glucose-6-Phosphate Dehydrogenase Deficiency, G6PD Variants, and Ovalocytosis in Human Populations (Oxford University Press, 1985)

References

1928 births
2005 deaths
Neurological disease deaths in Ohio
Deaths from Parkinson's disease
Physical anthropologists
Harvard University alumni
University of Michigan alumni
People from Winchester, Massachusetts
Winchester High School (Massachusetts) alumni
20th-century American anthropologists